The 2021 European Shooting Championships were held from 22 May to 5 June 2021 in Osijek, Croatia. 1,473 athletes from 52 countries competed.

Schedule

Events
82 medal events:

Age: 46 events in seniors and 36 events in juniors.

Number: 43 individual events and 39 team events.

Due to the low number of entries, some events was a Grand Prix and didn't count as an event for the European Championship and not counted in medal table.

Key:  S=Senior, J=Junior / I=Individual, T=Team

Olympic Qualification

16 Tokyo olympic quota places in following events (Shooting at the 2020 Summer Olympics):

 10m Air Rifle Women and Men (2+2)
 10m Air Pistol Women and Men (1+1)
 25m Rapid Fire Pistol Men (1)
 25m Sport Pistol Women (1)
 50m Rifle 3x40 Women and Men (1+1)
 Trap Women and Men (1+1)
 Skeet Women and Men (2+2)

Athletes 
10 m events: 52 countries, 577 athletes, 1194 starts.

25m, 50m, 300m and shotgun events: 49 countries, 896 athletes, 1929 starts.

Total: 52 countries, 1473 athletes, 3123 starts.

Medal table
73 events counted on medal table consist of 37 Individual and 36 Team events. Results Book:

Results

Men's Senior events

Women's Senior events

Senior Open events

Mixed Senior events

Men's Junior events

Women's Junior events

Junior Open events

Mixed Junior events

See also
 Shooting at the 2020 Summer Olympics
 2021 ISSF World Cup

References

External links
 Results book
 Archived

European Shooting Championships
European Shooting Championships
2021 European Shooting Championships
European Shooting Championships
Shooting competitions in Croatia
European Shooting Championships
Sport in Osijek
European Shooting Championships